Agylla semirufa is a moth of the family Erebidae. It was described by George Hampson in 1896. It is found in Assam, India.

References

Moths described in 1896
semirufa
Moths of Asia